Raynard Jackson is an American Republican political consultant, lobbyist, and radio host based in Washington, D.C. He served on the presidential campaigns of George H. W. Bush and George W. Bush.

Early life and education 
A native of St. Louis, Missouri, Jackson attended Soldan High School. He earned a Bachelor of Science in accounting from Oral Roberts University in Tulsa, Oklahoma, and a Master of Arts in International Business from George Mason University in Fairfax, Virginia.

Career
Jackson has worked on numerous Republican United States Senate, gubernatorial, and congressional political campaigns. He is the president and CEO of Raynard Jackson & Associates, LLC (RJA), a lobbying firm based in Washington, D.C. He hosts his own Internet-based radio show on U.S. Talk Network. 

Jackson is a supporter of Donald Trump. Jackson has criticized liberal political pundits Joy Reid and Don Lemon, claiming that they "are killing more black folks than any white person with a sheet over their face."

See also
 Black conservatism in the United States

References

External links
 Official website

Year of birth missing (living people)
Living people
American political consultants
George Mason University alumni
Oral Roberts University alumni
People from St. Louis
Washington, D.C., Republicans